is a 1938 black-and-white Japanese film directed by Mansaku Itami and based on the famous five-part novel Les Misérables by French poet and novelist Victor Hugo. The film's setting was changed from France to Edo-period Japan.

The great jidai-geki star Denjiro Okochi plays the Jean Valjean role, and an eighteen-year-old Setsuko Hara features as Cosette.

Plot summary

Cast

References

External links
 

1938 films
Japanese black-and-white films
1930s Japanese-language films
1930s historical drama films
Films based on Les Misérables
Japanese historical drama films
1938 drama films